Meedo is a genus of Australian araneomorph spiders in the family Trachycosmidae, and was first described by Barbara York Main in 1987.

Species
 it contains thirteen species:
Meedo bluff Platnick, 2002 – Australia (New South Wales)
Meedo booti Platnick, 2002 – Australia (New South Wales)
Meedo broadwater Platnick, 2002 – Australia (Queensland)
Meedo cohuna Platnick, 2002 – eastern Australia
Meedo flinders Platnick, 2002 – Australia (South Australia)
Meedo gympie Platnick, 2002 – Australia (Queensland, New South Wales)
Meedo harveyi Platnick, 2002 – Australia (Western Australia)
Meedo houstoni Main, 1987 (type) – Australia (Western Australia)
Meedo mullaroo Platnick, 2002 – Australia (South Australia, Queensland to Victoria)
Meedo munmorah Platnick, 2002 – Australia (New South Wales)
Meedo ovtsharenkoi Platnick, 2002 – Australia (Western Australia)
Meedo yarragin Platnick, 2002 – Australia (Western Australia)
Meedo yeni Platnick, 2002 – Australia (Western Australia, South Australia, Victoria)

References

Araneomorphae genera
Gallieniellidae